Canta in Italiano in Italian, or Canta en Italiano in Spanish, both meaning "Sings in Italian", may refer to:

Canta en Italiano (Gene Pitney EP), 1965
Canta in Italiano (Astrud Gilberto album), 1968
Canta in Italiano (Dalida album), 1969
Canta en Italiano (Daniela Romo EP), 1983
Canta en Italiano, 1985 album by Luis Miguel